Aden ( ʻAdan) is a governorate of Yemen, including the city of Aden.  At the 2004 census, it had a population of 589,419.  The ancient capital, the port city of Crater, was located here.

Aden was under British rule in the period from 1839 to 1967. In 1967, after years of struggle, Aden and other southern governorates gained their independence. The city of Aden subsequently became the capital of South Yemen between 1967 and 1990. In 1990, both South Yemen and North Yemen combined to form the present Republic of Yemen. Aden is now the commercial capital of the Republic of Yemen.

The archipelago of Socotra was part of the Governorate of Aden, but it was attached to Hadhramaut Governorate in 2004.

On 6 December 2015, the governor of Aden, General Jaafar Mohammed Saad, was killed in a car bomb attack that also killed six members of his entourage. Several other bystanders were wounded. Shortly after the attack, the Islamic State claimed responsibility.
On July 29, 2020, Ahmed Hamed Lamlas, the STC secretary general was appointed by the Yemeni in-exile  president as new governor of Aden as a result of the modified version of the Riyadh agreement signed between the Yemeni government and the southern transitional council representatives.

Geography

At 1,114 square kilometers, Aden is the second-smallest governorate in Yemen by area. However, its population density is the second-highest, after Sanaa Governorate.

Adjacent governorates

 Lahij Governorate (north)

Districts
Aden Governorate is divided into the following 8 districts. These districts are further divided into sub-districts, and then further subdivided into villages:

 Al Buraiqeh District
 Al Mansura District
 Al Mualla District
 Ash Shaikh Outhman District
 Attawahi District
 Craiter District
 Dar Sad District
 Khur Maksar District

References

 
Aden Governorate
Aden
World War II sites in Aden